Jafet Penda Ya Ndakolo (born 23 March 1960 at Oshigambo) is a Namibian  SWAPO politician and current governor of Oshikoto Region. He served as Minister of Defence from 2015 to 2020. After losing his position as minister in 2020 he was appointed to his old position as governor again.

Ya Ndakolo fought for the Peoples Liberation Army of Namibia (PLAN). He studied at the Eastern and Southern Management Institute (ESAMA), and was from 1980 to 1989 a specialist in radio communication warfare.

He was a SWAPO district coordinator between 1990 and 1992 before getting elected as Regional Councillor for Omuthiya Gwiipundi Constituency in Oshikoto Region, eventually being elevated as the Region's governor. He replaced Nico Kaiyamo as a member of the National Council in 2004.

In 2014, he was awarded The Most Distinguished Order of Namibia: First Class by president Hifikepunye Pohamba.

References

1960 births
Living people
People's Liberation Army of Namibia personnel
People from Oshikoto Region
Defence ministers of Namibia